Dylan Disu (born November 12, 2000) is an American college basketball player for the Texas Longhorns of the Big 12 Conference. He previously played for the Vanderbilt Commodores.

High school career
Disu played basketball for Hendrickson High School in Pflugerville, Texas. He led his team to back-to-back District 13-6A titles. As a senior, Disu averaged 23.4 points and 10.1 rebounds per game, earning district MVP honors. He scored a school-record 51 points against Leander High School. A four-star recruit, Disu committed to playing college basketball for Vanderbilt over offers from SMU, Georgia Tech, Texas A&M and Illinois, among others.

College career
As a freshman at Vanderbilt, Disu averaged 7.4 points and 5.7 rebounds per game. On February 17, 2021, he posted career-highs of 29 points and 16 rebounds in an 82–78 loss to Kentucky. One week later, head coach Jerry Stackhouse announced that Disu would miss the rest of the season with a knee injury. As a sophomore, he averaged 15 points and 9.2 rebounds per game, leading the Southeastern Conference (SEC) in rebounding prior to his injury. He was named SEC Scholar-Athlete of the Year. After the season, Disu transferred to Texas, which he described as his "dream school growing up."

Career statistics

College

|-
| style="text-align:left;"| 2019–20
| style="text-align:left;"| Vanderbilt
| 32 || 31 || 27.0 || .358 || .295 || .548 || 5.7 || 1.0 || 1.1 || .9 || 7.4
|-
| style="text-align:left;"| 2020–21
| style="text-align:left;"| Vanderbilt
| 17 || 17 || 31.6 || .492 || .369 || .736 || 9.2 || 1.4 || 1.1 || 1.2 || 15.0
|-
| style="text-align:left;"| 2021–22
| style="text-align:left;"| Texas
| 26 || 0 || 10.9 || .466 || .133 || .813 || 3.2 || .4 || .4 || .8 || 3.7
|-
|- class="sortbottom"
| style="text-align:center;" colspan="2"| Career
| 75 || 48 || 22.5 || .426 || .304 || .685 || 5.6 || .9 || .9 || 1.0 || 7.9

References

External links
Texas Longhorns bio
Vanderbilt Commodores bio

2000 births
Living people
American men's basketball players
Basketball players from Texas
People from Pflugerville, Texas
Small forwards
Texas Longhorns men's basketball players
Power forwards (basketball)
Vanderbilt Commodores men's basketball players